Bury College is a further education college located within the Borough of Bury, Greater Manchester, England. The college offers a wide range of subjects from the A-Level, BTEC, and diploma format among other subjects provided.

Overview
Bury College is a further education college that provides qualifications for school leavers pursuing A Levels, vocational qualifications and apprenticeships. It also provides a range of courses for adults, including university qualifications run in partnership with the University of Bolton.

History
Bury College began as Bury Technical College. From May 1940 to May 1946, Bury Technical College was occupied by the Royal Military College of Science (Fire Control Wing) to provide specialist courses in the use of fire control instruments during the war. Following Local Government reorganisation in 1974, the college merged with Radcliffe Technical College to form the Bury Metropolitan College of Further Education.

Bury College became a tertiary college on 1 September 1987, as a result of Bury Council's decision to develop a tertiary provision system for Bury. The college was formed by the merger of the then Bury College of Further Education premises in Bury and Radcliffe with Peel Sixth Form College, Stand Sixth Form College, and a number of Youth Training Scheme units located in various parts of the borough.

Facilities
Bury College has invested over £40 million in recent years on new facilities and buildings for students.  The college now has new facilities for construction and engineering, IT suites and computer aided design studios.  The new Woodbury developments provide a new learning resource centre and library, industry standard art studios, a new outdoor courtyard to increase social space and classrooms.

Sites
 Millennium Centre - This building provides a learning environment equipped with studios, laboratories, IT suites, Learning Resource Centres and classrooms. Student facilities are with indoor and outdoor social areas.
 Beacon Centre - provides facilities for Performance Arts, Humanities, Languages, Health and Social Care, Childcare and Uniformed Services. A theatre, dance and rehearsal studios, together with a recording studio, language laboratory and coffee bar are situated here.
 Woodbury Centre - houses facilities for hair, beauty and complementary therapy salons, catering facilities including the Three Seasons Restaurant and Bistro and art studios with Apple computer's technology.  
 Venture Centre - In 2012 a new development on the Woodbury site opened providing a new learning resource centre, landscaped courtyard, IT facilities and classrooms.
 Prospects Centre - this is the electrical engineering centre of the college. It has specialist laboratories, workshops and IT suites to accommodate a wide range of technology based subjects.
 The Innovation Centre - supports students studying Engineering and Technology courses, including the new Diploma in Engineering. The building incorporates an Engineering Workshop, IT suites, Computer-Aided Design Studio and Classrooms equipped with information and communications technologies.
 The Aspire Centre - provides sports facilities for students, including exercise and fitness studios with sprung floors. In addition, the building houses the College's assessment centre for examinations and on-line testing, providing specialist facilities for examinations candidates.
 The Construction Skills Centre - is equipped with tools, equipment and machinery. It supports the college's existing applied engineering and technology centres and provides further investment to develop and offer vital training to the construction industry. 
 Enterprise Centre - houses classrooms and IT facilities.
 Bury College Nursery - a fifty-place nursery which opened in September 2004 and provides places for students with young children, and the local community.

Academic performance
Bury College's results are consistently above the national average and in 2013 the College achieved an exceptional pass rate of 100% for 37 of its Advanced Level courses. The college saw exceptional results for Vocational A Level and National Diploma courses with 100% pass rates in many courses.

Notable former pupils

Stand Grammar School
 Tony Binns, Ron Lister Professor of Geography
 Lol Creme, musician
 Lawrence Demmy, 1950s ice-dancer (with Jean Westwood)
 John Heilpern, drama critic, former husband of Joan Juliet Buck
 Jack Howlett CBE, computer scientist and director from 1961 to 1975 of the Atlas Computer Laboratory (produced many computer software innovations) (1923–30)
 Howard Jacobson, author (1953–60)
 Martin Kelner, radio broadcaster (1960–67)
 Henry Livings, playwright (1941–48)
 Philip Lowrie, plays Dennis Tanner in Coronation Street
 Norman McVicker, Leicestershire and Warwickshire cricketer
 Al Read, radio comedian
 Mark E. Smith, singer
 John Spencer, snooker player
 Julie Stevens, actress (1948–53)
 Leslie Turnberg, Baron Turnberg, Professor of Medicine from 1973 to 1997 at the University of Manchester (1945–52)

Stand Sixth-Form College
 Ivan Lewis, Labour, later Independent, MP from 1997-2019 for Bury South and Cabinet Minister during the Blair and Brown administrations.
Jonathan Ashworth, Labour MP and Shadow Secretary of State for Work and Pensions, 2021-present
Warren Hegg, former Lancashire and England cricketer
Guy Garvey Lead singer of rock band, Elbow
Alex Hargreaves Songwriter, HMS Sirens

References

External links
 Bury College

Education in the Metropolitan Borough of Bury
Further education colleges in Greater Manchester
Learning and Skills Beacons
Educational institutions established in 1987
1987 establishments in England